Cejkov is a village and municipality in the Trebišov District in the Košice Region of eastern Slovakia.

History
In historical records the village was first mentioned in 1381.

Geography
The village lies at an altitude of 172 metres and covers an area of 20.845 km².
It has a population of about 1210 people.

Ethnicity
The village is approximately 97% Slovak.

Notable people
 Ján Pivarník, football player and coach

Facilities
The village has a public library, a gymnasium and a football pitch. It also has a doctors surgery.

Genealogical resources

The records for genealogical research are available at the state archive "Statny Archiv in Kosice, Slovakia"

 Roman Catholic church records (births/marriages/deaths): 1772-1895 (parish A)
 Greek Catholic church records (births/marriages/deaths): 1773-1895 (parish A)
 Reformated church records (births/marriages/deaths): 1816-1895 (parish B)

See also
 List of municipalities and towns in Slovakia

External links
Wayback Machine
Surnames of living people in Cejkov

Villages and municipalities in Trebišov District
Zemplín (region)